A referendum on the new constitution of France was held in Ivory Coast on 28 September 1958 as part of a wider referendum held across the French Union. The new constitution would see the country become part of the new French Community if accepted, or result in independence if rejected. It was approved by 99.99% of voters.

Results

References

1958 in Ivory Coast
1958 referendums
September 1958 events in Africa
Referendums in Ivory Coast
Constitutional referendums